Methioides cicatricosa is a species of beetle in the family Cerambycidae, the only species in the genus Methioides.

References

Xystrocerini
Monotypic beetle genera